Amy Mallon  is the head women's basketball coach at Drexel.

Career
On March 27, 2020, it was announced that Mallon would become the head coach of Drexel's Women's Basketball team, taking the helm from coach Denise Dillon after she accepted the head coaching position at Villanova.

Head Coaching Record

References

External links
 Official bio

Living people
American women's basketball coaches
Drexel Dragons women's basketball coaches
Saint Joseph's Hawks women's basketball coaches
Villanova Wildcats women's basketball coaches
Richmond Spiders women's basketball players
Saint Joseph's Hawks women's basketball players
American expatriate basketball people in Luxembourg
Year of birth missing (living people)
Rosemont College